Until January 1, 2007, Aulum-Haderup was a municipality (Danish, kommune) in Ringkjøbing County on the Jutland peninsula in west Denmark.  The municipality covered an area of 247 km², and had a total population of 6,730 (2005).  Its latest mayor was Christian Dam Larsen, a member of the Venstre (Liberal Party) political party.

The main town and the site of its municipal council was the town of Aulum.

Aulum-Haderup municipality ceased to exist as the result of Kommunalreformen ("The Municipality Reform" of 2007). On January 1 2007 it was merged with former Herning, Trehøje, and Aaskov municipalities to form the new Herning municipality.  This created a municipality with an area of 1,336 km² and a total population of 82,935 (2005). The new municipality belongs to the Region Midtjylland ("Mid-Jutland Region").

External links

References  
 Municipal statistics: NetBorger Kommunefakta, delivered from KMD aka Kommunedata (Municipal Data)
 Municipal mergers and neighbors: Eniro new municipalities map

Former municipalities of Denmark